John Benton Callis (January 3, 1828September 24, 1898) was an American businessman, politician, and Wisconsin pioneer.  He served as a Union Army officer during the American Civil War and was then elected as a reconstruction-era U.S. congressman from Alabama.  He later served in the Wisconsin State Assembly.

Early life 
Born in Fayetteville, North Carolina, Callis moved to Tennessee in 1834 with his parents, who settled in Carroll County, and thence, in 1840, to Lancaster, Wisconsin Territory. He attended the common schools in the Wisconsin Territory, though quite primitive in his days.  For several years, he studied medicine under Dr. J. H. Higgins of Lancaster, but ultimately abandoned that work.  He went to Minnesota for work in 1848, where he was employed on the construction of Fort Ripley. He moved to California in 1851 and engaged in mining and the mercantile business. He went to Central America in 1853. He returned to Lancaster in the fall of that year and again engaged in mercantile pursuits.

Civil War service

He helped form the Lancaster unit that became Co. K of the Seventh Regiment, Wisconsin Volunteer Infantry. When the unit was Federalized, he entered the Union Army as a lieutenant, and was promoted to captain, August 30, 1861. The Seventh Wisconsin was part of the famed "Iron Brigade of the West." Due to the high casualty rate among its officers, Callis led the regiment at the Battle of South Mountain, Antietam, and several other engagements.  He was promoted to major on January 5, 1863. He was shot in the chest on the first day at Gettysburg and lay on the battlefield until the Confederate withdrawal three days later. After a lengthy recovery, he rejoined the Army and was appointed by President Abraham Lincoln military superintendent of the War Department at Washington, D.C., in 1864. He was promoted to lieutenant colonel February 11, 1865, and was subsequently granted a double brevet to brigadier general of volunteers.

In Alabama 

After the war, he was granted a commission as a captain in the regular United States Army and assigned to the 45th U.S. Infantry Regiment.  With his regiment, he was assigned to work on reconstruction affairs in Huntsville, Alabama.  During his service, he was called to a property where the landowner continued to hold people as slaves and treat them as if slavery were still legal.  When Callis saw the man preparing to whip a girl, he stabbed him through the chest.  For his act, several citizens of Huntsville presented him with gold watch with an inscribed case, depicting scenes of his act.

He resigned his commission on February 4, 1868. Upon the readmission of the State of Alabama to representation Callis was elected as a Republican to the Fortieth Congress and served from July 21, 1868, to March 3, 1869. He was not a candidate for renomination in 1868.  During his time in Congress, he was the author of the first Ku Klux Klan Act, which passed the House but was defeated in the Senate.

Return to Wisconsin 
He returned to Lancaster and engaged in the real-estate business.

He was elected to a single one-year term in the Wisconsin State Assembly in 1874 as part of the short-lived Liberal Reform Party.

He retired from active pursuits, and died in Lancaster on September 24, 1898. He was interred in Hillside Cemetery.

Personal life and family
John Benton Callis was the eldest child of Henry Callis and his wife Christina ( Benton) Callis.  Callis had two younger sisters.  His nephew, George Barnett, was a career United States Marine Corps officer and became the 12th Commandant of the Marine Corps during the presidency of Woodrow Wilson.

John Benton Callis married Martha "Mattie" Barnett of Pittsburgh, Pennsylvania.  They had five children together.

References

External links
 Retrieved on 2008-02-14

|-

1828 births
1898 deaths
Businesspeople from Wisconsin
Iron Brigade
Members of the Wisconsin State Assembly
Politicians from Fayetteville, North Carolina
People from Lancaster, Wisconsin
People of North Carolina in the American Civil War
People of Wisconsin in the American Civil War
Republican Party members of the United States House of Representatives from Alabama
Union Army officers
Wisconsin Reformers (19th century)
19th-century American politicians
19th-century American businesspeople